2015–16 in Kenyan football may refer to:
 2015 in Kenyan football
 2016 in Kenyan football